Doyles River, a perennial river of the Hastings River catchment, is located in the Mid North Coast region of New South Wales, Australia.

Course and features
Doyles River rises on the eastern slopes of the Great Dividing Range, southeast of Tobins Creek, and flows generally south southeast, northeast, and then southeast, before reaching its confluence with the Ellenborough River, southwest of Ellenborough.

See also

 Rivers of New South Wales
 List of rivers of Australia

References

 

Rivers of New South Wales
Mid North Coast
Port Macquarie-Hastings Council